Gav Bazeh (also Romanized as Gāv Bāzeh and Gav Pazeh) is a village in Khaveh-ye Shomali Rural District, in the Central District of Delfan County, Lorestan Province, Iran. At the 2006 census, its population was 475, in 115 families.

References 

Towns and villages in Delfan County